Christian Stamm is a German actor, screenwriter, director, and lawyer. He is the main character of the upcoming feature films Vampyres and Impar , and participated in the box-office films Rey Gitano (2015), Perdiendo el Norte Cerca de tu Casa, Sonata per a Violoncel, Mr. Nice and Escalofrío. He also played the main character in over 50 short films, including the Los Angeles Webseries Festival awarded Desenterrados, La Rosa del Desierto and Carne de Gaviota (Seagull Meat; 2015), and participated in the Spanish television series Cuéntame cómo pasó, Gran Hotel (Grand Hotel; 2013), and El Barco (The Boat; chapters 13 and 14).

Alongside his work as an actor, Stamm is involved in directing, producing, as well as show hosting. He assisted Alicia Verdés with the direction of the awarded Alba significa amanecer (Alba means dawn; 2012), he is currently producing and starring in the new comedy television series Hans and François, and he hosted the Primavera Sound International music festival 2015 presentation gala. Stamm is also a lawyer and member of the Spanish bar association.

Early life
Stamm was born in Hilden, Solingen, Germany. Both his mother, Gisela Gross, a bank sales employee, and his father, Jürgen Stamm, a machine engineer, were from there. Seven years later, the family moved to Comerio, a small town near Varese, in northern Italy. That is where he spent most of his youth and development years, but also in France, and later on in the United States. Stamm's father was also a photographer. At the age of 13, he was introduced to martial arts and oriental culture, by attending regular training with Master Fabio Sozzani (6th Dan), and in the “Shaolin Mon Karate Do” dojo of Sensei Kenji Tokitsu (9th Dan). Stamm achieved a black belt six years later.

In 1985, Stamm moved to Port Jervis, New York, where he graduated from Port Jervis High School. Christian Stamm, Class of 1985 - Port Jervis High School - Classmates. One year later, in 1986, Stamm received his European Baccalaureate at the European School, Varese. After that, he moved back to Germany to study law at the Heidelberg University Faculty of Law, and seven years later to Spain, to finish his career at the University of Barcelona, Spain. Stamm got his law degree in 1997 and started to work at the law firm of J. Isern Patentes y Marcas S.L. At the same time, he continued acting and performing.

Career
Stamm studied acting in several different schools, including Estudi Nancy Tuñón in Barcelona, and Meisner technique with the San Francisco-based acting coach Javier Galitó-Cava. At the same time, he got involved in various theatre plays, as well as over 50 short film projects, of Spanish cinematography schools including Escola de Cinema & Audiovisuals de Catalunya (ESCAC) and Bandeàpart. He made his film debut in 2004, in the feature movie FAQ: Frequently Asked Questions, by Carlos Atanes, as a voice actor. After that, he played the mute father of the lead in Escalofrío (Shiver), directed by Isidro Ortiz and produced by Guillermo del Toro.

In 2009, Stamm played a Nazi officer on the run in Tornarem (transl.“We'll be back”), by Mireia Ros. He later appeared in the feature films Mr. Nice, directed by Bernard Rose and starring Rhys Ifans; Fuga de cerebros 2 (“Brain loss, 2”), by Carlos Therón, and later on Sonata Para Violoncelo (Sonata for Celo), by Anna M. Bofarull. He did the voice-over for three supporting roles for the Spanish synchronization of Ron Howard's Angels & Demons, starring Tom Hanks, giving his characters German or Italian accents when speaking Spanish. He appeared over several episodes, of Spanish TV series including El Barco (“The Boat”; Antena3), La República 2 (“The Republic, 2, TVE), Gran Hotel ("Grand Hotel", Antena3), and The Avatars on the Disney Channel.

The more than 50 short films and web series in which Stamm starred or co-starred included Desenterrados (Engl. Title Unearthed), a three times Los Angeles Web Festival 2012 awarded web series by Xavi Cortés, the short films La rosa del desierto (“Desert Rose”), by Emilio Alonso, and Carne de gaviota (“Seagull meat”), by Felipe Espinosa, as well as the award-winning The Crononaut, by Désirée Haupt, and Errarte en la sombra ("Erring you in the shadow"), the short films La calle es mia (“This street is mine”), by Javi Gonzalez, for which Stamm was nominated for Best Actor at the Godarín Awards, and If My Father Knew, filmed by Stamm, for which he was nominated Best Actor in a Monologue, at the TESPO Awards 2009.
 
In 2013 Stamm played the role of Frank, a man between two women, whose fear of being left alone had driven him to inflict blindness upon himself, in Impar ("Uneven"), by Sergio Domingez. El Balcon de la Espera premiered in "The Little Secret Films" in 2015. In 2014, Stamm was hired by Artistic Metropol to portray Ted, the vampire hunter and leading character of Victor Matellano's 2015 film Vampyres, a re-make of the 1970s cult film Vampyres, with English actress Caroline Munro. In the comedy Rey gitano ("Gipsy King"), by Goya Award-winning Juanma Bajo Ulloa, he played the German minister advisor L. Brücken; in the home eviction drama Cerca de tu casa ("Near your home"), directed by Eduard Cortés, he played the rich home owner Günther, and in the comedy Perdiendo el Norte ("Losing the North", which in Spanish also means 'losing one's mind'), by Nacho G. Velilla, about two unemployed Spanish friends, an economist and a scientist, who try their luck in Germany, he played an investigator who puts his language skills on the stand. Also that year, he appeared on the Spanish television series Cuéntame cómo pasó ("Tell me how it happened"; TVE), in its 16th season, as Manuel, as well as in the series Sin identidad ("Without Identity"; Antena3).

References 

German male film actors
German male television actors
German emigrants to Spain
Heidelberg University alumni
1967 births
Living people
Expatriate actors in Spain
German expatriates in Spain